Henry Tigan, born Henry Tony Kirumaganyi, is a Ugandan reggae and afro beats artist.

Music
Tigan has collaborated with Marlon Usher. Bobi Wine and Mighty Mistic. He has had hit songs like "Emiranga", "Muzudde", "Abogezi", "Lwaki Oninza", "Waddawa", "Nsiimye Gwe", "Empisazo" and "Aneganye".

Discography

Songs
Abogezi
My country
Waddawa
Emilanga
Aneganye

Awards and recognition
 Best new artist Pearl of Africa Music Awards, 2008
nominated for Best reggae artist or group Pearl of Africa Music Awards, 2007

References 

21st-century Ugandan male singers
Living people
Kumusha
Year of birth missing (living people)